Major General Lord Michael Fitzalan-Howard,  (22 October 1916 – 2 November 2007) was a senior officer in the British Army. He later served as Marshal of the Diplomatic Corps in the British Royal Household for ten years until 1982, and Gold Stick-in-Waiting and Colonel of the Life Guards for 20 years, finally retiring in 1999.

Early life
Fitzalan-Howard was the second son of Bernard Fitzalan-Howard, 3rd Baron Howard of Glossop and Mona Fitzalan-Howard, 11th Baroness Beaumont. He was 15 months younger than the eldest sibling, Miles, 17th Duke of Norfolk. He had two other brothers and four sisters, all with first names beginning with the letter "M". He grew up at his mother's family seat, Carlton Towers in North Yorkshire.

Fitzalan-Howard and his elder brother, Miles, followed parallel courses in their education and career. Both were educated at Ampleforth College, before Oxford and Cambridge – Michael at Trinity College, Cambridge from 1935 to 1938, and Miles at Christ Church, Oxford. Both then took a commission in the British Army – Michael in the Scots Guards in 1938 and Miles in the Grenadier Guards. Michael joined the 3rd Battalion of the Scots Guards when it was formed in April 1944.

Army career
As majors, the brothers both fought in tanks in the Guards Armoured Division in the Second World War, fighting in the breakout from Caen after D-Day: Michael commanded a squadron of the 3rd Scots Guards, while Miles was brigade major of 5th Guards Armoured Brigade. A third brother, Martin, commanded a tank in the 2nd Grenadier Guards. Michael and Miles both won the Military Cross (MC) in 1944. Michael's MC was awarded for leading several attacks in the bocage near Estry and Chênedollé. He then became brigade major of the 32nd Guards Brigade, beating his brother in the race to Brussels. Their brigades then leapfrogged each other on the advance through Eindhoven to the Rhine and the Elbe. Michael was mentioned in despatches.

Michael and Miles, both career officers, remained in the army after the war. Michael was best man at Miles' wedding in 1949. Both were promoted to colonel in 1958, and then to brigadier in 1961. Miles became a major general in 1963, three months before his brother.

Fitzalan-Howard served as brigade major with the 1st Guards Brigade in Palestine, and then as an instructor at the Staff Colleges in Haifa in 1946 and at Camberley immediately afterwards. He served as brigade major of the 2nd Guards Brigade in Malaya and in London, and was appointed a Member of the Order of the British Empire in 1949. He was appointed a Member of the Royal Victorian Order in 1953 after working on the funeral of King George VI. He served as second-in-command of the 1st Scots Guards in Suez, then commanded the 2nd Scots Guards in 4th Guards Brigade of the British Army of the Rhine. He promoted to brigadier and became chief of staff, London District, in 1958. He returned to Germany to command the 4th Guards Brigade, and was advanced to Commander of the Order of the British Empire in 1962.

He was promoted to major general in 1964 and became the first commander of the ground forces in Allied Command Europe Mobile Force, a tri-service unit combining forces from several members of NATO. He was then Chief of Staff of Southern Command, based in Salisbury. He was appointed a Companion of the Order of the Bath in 1968, and was Major-General commanding the Household Division and General Officer Commanding London District from 1968 to 1971. He was also colonel of the Lancashire Regiment from 1966 to 1970, and then colonel of the Queen's Lancashire Regiment until 1978, and honorary colonel of Cambridge University OTC from 1968 to 1971. He retired from the army in 1971, and was advanced to Knight Commander of the Royal Victorian Order.

Later life
After retiring from the army, Fitzalan-Howard served as Marshal of the Diplomatic Corps from 1972 to 1981, and was advanced to Knight Grand Cross of the Royal Victorian Order when he retired from that role. He served as a Deputy Lieutenant for Wiltshire from 1974, and was also chairman of the Territorial Army and Volunteer Reserve Council.

In 1975, Fitzalan-Howard's elder brother, Miles succeeded as the 17th Duke of Norfolk, and Michael became Lord Michael Fitzalan-Howard when he and his siblings were granted the rank of younger sons and daughters of a duke that year.

He succeeded The Earl Mountbatten of Burma as Gold Stick-in-Waiting and Colonel of the Life Guards in 1979, offices which he held for 20 years.  He became an Extra Equerry to Queen Elizabeth II in 1999.

Family
Fitzalan-Howard married three times.

He first married Jean Marion Hamilton-Dalrymple, daughter of Sir Hew Hamilton-Dalrymple, 9th Baronet, on 4 March 1946. They had a daughter, (also named Jean), but her mother died shortly afterwards, on 28 July 1947. Their daughter, Jean, went on to become a lady-in-waiting to Diana, Princess of Wales.

He remarried on 20 April 1950, to Jane Margaret Meade-Newman, daughter of Captain William Patrick Meade-Newman. They had a daughter and four sons. His second wife died on 25 December 1995.

He married again, on 2 July 1997, to Victoria Winifred Baring, daughter of Colonel Reginald Edmund Maghlin Russell and the widow of Sir Mark Baring.

Michael Fitzalan-Howard died, aged 91, in 2007, survived by his third wife, the daughter of his first marriage, and his five children from his second marriage.

References

External links
Obituary in The Times, 14 November 2007
Obituary, The Daily Telegraph, 5 November 2007.
Obituary, Old Amplefordians
thepeerage.com

1917 births
2007 deaths
People educated at Ampleforth College
Alumni of Trinity College, Oxford
British Roman Catholics
Michael Fitzalan-Howard
British Army personnel of World War II
Commanders of the Order of the British Empire
English Roman Catholics
Companions of the Order of the Bath
Knights Grand Cross of the Royal Victorian Order
Recipients of the Military Cross
Marshals of the Diplomatic Corps
Scots Guards officers
British Army major generals
Knights of Malta
Equerries
Younger sons of barons
Academics of the Staff College, Camberley